Xestocephalus is a genus of leafhoppers (family Cicadellidae). There are at least 120 described species in Xestocephalus.

See also
 List of Xestocephalus species

References

Further reading

External links

 

Aphrodinae
Cicadellidae genera